was a Japanese samurai of the Sengoku period, who served the Imagawa clan.

Samurai
1583 deaths
Year of birth unknown